is a Japanese pop music composer, arranger, and musician. He is the elder brother of composer Shunichi Makaino.

Biography 
Makaino was born in the city of Toyohashi, in Aichi Prefecture. His father Noboru was a music-lover and amateur composer, and he got Kōji to become familiar with musical instruments. He, his father, and his brother played together as a tango band. After graduating from Aichi Prefectural Commercial High School in Toyohashi, he studied music at the Naomi College of Music before dropping out in 1967 join a group called "Blue Sharm." The group only issued four singles, and broke up in 1970.

Since 1972, when he arranged for Hideki Saijo's album Chance wa Ichido, he has worked in composition and arrangement. He has been active composing Kayōkyoku; idol songs; enka; film, TV drama, and anime soundtracks; and commercial songs; among others. Besides his hundreds of compositions, he was in charge of soundtrack for a number of anime series, most notably The Rose of Versailles, and a few live action series and films. He has worked under the pseudonyms Mark Davis, Jimmy Johnson, Michael Korgen, from the fact that since the late 1970s, many foreign artists have been hired on TV CMs, and because he wanted to show he had a foreign style in some ways.

Compositions 
Makaino's compositions are:

Filmography 
Films, anime series, etc. where Makaino has been credited for the soundtrack:

Live action films 
Katakuri-ka no kōfuku
Toilet no Hanako-san
The Audition
Seitoshokun
Ai to Makoto
Zabunguru Graffiti

Anime television 
Listed by the year they started airing.
The Rose of Versailles (1979)
Combat Mecha Xabungle (1982)
Creamy Mami, the Magic Angel (1983, arrangement only)
Persia, the Magic Fairy (1984)
Pastel Yumi, the Magic Idol (1986)
Bubblegum Crisis (1987, original video animation)
The Burning Wild Man (1988)
The Adventures of Hutch the Honeybee (1989 remake)
Yadamon (1992)
Nintama Rantarō (1993)

TV drama series 
Supergirl
Hana no Joshikō Sentokatorea Gakuen
Getsuyō Drama Land
Ten Made Agare

References

External links 
 

1948 births
Anime composers
Japanese film score composers
Japanese keyboardists
Japanese male film score composers
Japanese music arrangers
Japanese pop musicians
Living people
People from Toyohashi